Grais may refer to:

 Grais (butterfly), a genus of butterflies
 Le Grais, a commune in France
 Folle blanche, also known as grais, a grape variety
 Grais, a surname; notable people with the name include:
 Michael Grais, American screenwriter

See also 
 Grays (disambiguation)